Dimitris Tzanakopoulos (Greek: Δημήτρης Τζανακόπουλος; born 5 June 1982) is a Greek politician and a lawyer. He was a Minister of State & the Government Spokesperson of the Hellenic Republic (Greece) in the cabinet of Alexis Tsipras between 2016 and 2019. In the snap general election of 7 July 2019 he was elected Member of Parliament for Athens (A).

Early life and education 
He was born in Athens in 1982. His older brother, Antonios Tzanakopoulos, is a professor of law at the University of Oxford, while his younger sister, Maria Tzanakopoulou, is a Lecturer at Birkbeck, University of London. Tzanakopoulos graduated from the Athens Law School with a Bachelor of Laws degree and a master's degree in Philosophy of Law. He is a PhD candidate in Legal Theory at the University of London. He has published academic papers and articles in the ‘Law and Critique’ journal; the collective volume of the ‘Nicos Poulantzas Institute’; and various other journals and newspapers.

Political career 
He was elected secretary of the SYRIZA Youth organisation in 2005. In 2012 he was appointed legal adviser to SYRIZA's parliamentary office and in 2015 he became director general of Prime Minister Alexis Tsipras office. From November 2016 until June 2019 he was Minister of State and Government Spokesperson. He was elected Member of Parliament for Athens (A) in the snap election of 7 July 2019.

References 

Biography

External links 
Official twitter account
Official facebook account

Syriza politicians
21st-century Greek politicians
1982 births
Living people
Lawyers from Athens
Government ministers of Greece
Greek MPs 2019–2023
Politicians from Athens
21st-century Greek lawyers